The 2022 World Mixed Doubles Qualification Event was held from December 2 to 7 at the Dumfries Ice Bowl in Dumfries, Scotland. The top four placing teams (Austria, Spain, Netherlands, Turkey) qualified for the 2023 World Mixed Doubles Curling Championship in Gangneung, South Korea.

Teams
The teams are as follows:

Round-robin standings
Final round-robin standings

Round-robin results

All draw times are listed in Greenwich Mean Time (UTC+00:00).

Draw 1
Friday, December 2, 17:15

Draw 2
Friday, December 2, 20:30

Draw 3
Saturday, December 3, 9:00

Draw 4
Saturday, December 3, 12:30

Draw 5
Saturday, December 3, 16:00

Draw 6
Saturday, December 3, 19:30

Draw 7
Sunday, December 4, 9:00

Draw 8
Sunday, December 4, 12:30

Draw 9
Sunday, December 4, 16:00

Draw 10
Sunday, December 4, 19:30

Draw 11
Monday, December 5, 9:00

Draw 12
Monday, December 5, 12:30

Draw 13
Monday, December 5, 16:00

Draw 14
Monday, December 5, 19:30

Playoffs

A Bracket

B Bracket

A Event

Semifinals
Tuesday, December 6, 10:00

Finals
Tuesday, December 6, 15:00

B Event

Semifinals
Tuesday, December 6, 15:00

Finals
Wednesday, December 7, 10:00

References

External links

 

World Mixed Doubles Curling Championship
World Mixed Doubles Qualification Event
International curling competitions hosted by Scotland
Sport in Dumfries
World Mixed Doubles Qualification Event
World Mixed Doubles Qualification Event